Dr Dharanidhar Sahu (born 1948) is an English writer from India. He is a professor in English and currently teaches at Berhampur University, Orissa, India.

References

ABOUT THE AUTHOR

Dharanidhar Sahu's (1948) first English novel The House of Serpents was published simultaneously in India (Orient Longman) and England (Sangam Books, London) in 1996. It was favourably reviewed in many Indian and foreign journals and newspapers. His second novel Simple Things of Life was published by Atlantic Publishers in 2001. His two-story collections – Heroes and Monsters: Ten Tales in Verse and The Decameron on a Goan Beach: Twelve Feel-Good Stories – have been published in India and abroad. His Three Shatakas of Bhartruhari: Love, Dispassion and Ethical Conduct, a verse translation of the Sanskrit classic Shataka-trayi of Bhartruhari, was published by Penman Publishers, New Delhi in 2003. His book titled Cats on a Hot Tin Roof: A Study of the Alienated Characters in the Plays of Tennessee Williams was published by Academic Foundation, New Delhi in 1990.

After his retirement as a Professor of English, he lives in Bhubaneswar with his wife Kanak Manjari who writes short stories in Oriya and translates stories from Bengali and Hindi.

 The Prince in Disguise is his third novel.

1948 births
Living people
English-language writers from India
Writers from Odisha